William Alexander Campbell (born 28 November 1961) is a retired international rugby union player who played 26 test matches and vice-captained for 15 for the Australian Wallabies in the position of lock from 1984 until 1990. He played 58 matches and captained 26 times (21 wins and five losses) for the Queensland Reds. Peter Jenkins named Campbell as one of the top 100 Wallabies in his book of the same name. Campbell ended his rugby career at 29 to further his medical studies and focus on his growing family.

Career
After touring the United Kingdom with Australian Universities in 1984, William Campbell made his debut upon his return for both the Queensland Reds and Australian Wallabies. Campbell's debut for Queensland was the start of the 'tall-timber era', according to Ian Diehm in Red, Red, Red when the state side was blessed with a number of tall back row forwards. At 202 cm and weighing in at 118 kilograms, Campbell had a gift making him an impressive athlete. Following his impressive performances for Queensland, Campbell was selected to make his international debut against Fiji in Suva the same year as a member of the 1984 Grand Slam Wallaby touring side. The Wallabies won the match 16 to 3. Campbell did not join the Wallabies again until 1986 when he played against Italy in Ballymore. He then went on to play against France and Argentina for both Queensland and the Wallabies in the same season. The tour by Argentina was only the second visit to Australia by the Pumas since 1983 and once again the athletic and tall Campbell stamped his authority on the line-outs in all of these matches.

During the same year, coach Alan Jones took the Wallabies into the Bledisloe Cup series following his mantra "KISS" – Keep It Simple Stupid. The Wallabies won the first Test match 13 to 12, the All Blacks won the second Test Match 13 to 12, with the Wallabies coming out on top after the third Test match, winning 22 to 9. This marked the first time the Australian Wallabies won the Bledisloe Cup on Kiwi soil since 1949. The coach presented an inscribed photograph of Campbell, reaching for the ball in a line-out, thanking him for playing 'such a big role in our Bledisloe Cup victory'.

In 1987 Campbell was vice-captain of the Wallabies against South Korea, England, the US, and Japan. the Wallabies won all their pool matches and progressed to the quarter finals against Ireland at Waratah Stadium on 7 June. The teaming of Campbell and Cutler once again achieved complete dominance at the line-outs and the pair were described as line-out gurus by Maxwell Howell. After winning the first three line-outs against France in the Semi-final, Campbell was sent off after suffering ligament damage. Australia lost to France 30 to 24.

In 1989, the British Lions toured Australia and Campbell was selected as captain of the Queensland side and vice-captain of the Wallabies. He played all three Tests against the Lions but the visitors took the series 2–1.

Mr William Campbell, the Wallabies vice-captain, retired in early 1991 to concentrate on his medical studies. Despite the lure of revenge he chose not to be a member of the 1991 Wallabies who would eventually hoist the William Webb Ellis trophy for the first time following victory of England at Twickenham. Instead, Campbell sat his surgical primary the day after the Wallabies won the World Cup, determined to pass.

Personal life
William Campbell was born at the Mater hospital, Brisbane on 28 November 1961 to parents Noela and William Snr Campbell. He was the 5th of 8 children. He attended Villa Nova College in his early school years and then moved to Gregory Terrace, where he progressed through age group rugby. After Terrace, Campbell studied medicine at Queensland University aiming at a profession of Vascular Surgeon where he attained Fellowship of the Royal Australasian College of Surgeons in general surgery and vascular surgery.

In 1980 at the age of 19, Campbell married his childhood sweetheart Lynne Irwin in Brisbane. Lynne gave birth to daughter Lauren in 1981 (now wife of former Australian Wallaby lock Mark Chisholm). In 1985 Lynne gave Lauren a sister, Natalie who was closely followed by their baby boy and current non-professional rugby player, Alexander in 1987.

Straight after the 1987 World Cup, Campbell headed to England with his young family on a one-year Kobe Steel scholarship at St Catherine's College, Oxford, where he played with The Oxford XV.

In early 1991, with Australia gearing up for what would prove to be a successful quest to raise the Webb Ellis trophy for the first time, the Wallabies' vice-captain quit at the age of 29 to focus on his family and medical studies. From 1993 to 1995, while still studying the fine form of vascular surgery, Campbell worked in the less advantaged areas of Nambour and Cairns to help increase the quality of available medical needs. During this time, Lynne gave birth to his fourth child, daughter Madeleine in 1993.

His dedication to his work saw him posted to Melbourne in 1998 where he worked for the Royal Melbourne Hospital, the Alfred Hospital and the Epworth. In 2009 he became one of the first Vascular surgeons in Australia to use less invasive surgical procedures such as (UGS) ultrasound guided sclerotherapy and endovenous laser ablation of varicose veins. He now owns 2 private practices with his wife in Melbourne, one at The Epworth Centre and another at Como Private Hospital.

References

External links
 http://www.melbournevascular.com.au

1961 births
Living people
Australia international rugby union players
Rugby union players from Brisbane
Rugby union forwards